East Jewett is a hamlet in Greene County, New York, United States. East Jewett had a post office from January 31, 1829, until early 2000; it still has its own ZIP code, 12424.

References

Hamlets in Greene County, New York
Hamlets in New York (state)